The 1919–20 season was the 22nd in the history of the Southern League, and the first following World War I. Portsmouth won the Southern League championship for the second time, whilst Mid Rhondda won Division Two. There were no promotions or relegations between divisions at the end of the season as all of the clubs in Division One bar Cardiff City were elected to the new Division Three of the Football League, with Cardiff elected to Division Two.

With only 10 clubs remaining (Caerphilly left the league) the league went through a realignment. The league was split into two national sections for England and Wales, with the winners of each section contesting a playoff for the Southern League championship. The remaining clubs in Division Two moved to the Welsh Section. In the English Section, Brighton & Hove Albion Reserves, Chatham Town, Millwall Reserves, Portsmouth Reserves, Reading Reserves, Southampton Reserves, and Watford Reserves rejoined the Southern League. New clubs to join were Boscombe, Charlton Athletic, Gillingham Reserves, Luton Town Reserves, Norwich City Reserves, and Thornycrofts.

Division One

A total of 22 teams contest the division, including 18 sides from previous season and four new teams.

Teams promoted from 1914–15 Division Two:
 Merthyr Town
 Swansea Town
 Brentford
 Newport County

Division Two

A total of 11 teams contest the division, including six sides from previous season and five new teams.

Newly elected teams:
 Aberaman Athletic
 Abertillery
 Caerphilly
 Mardy
 Porth Athletic

Football League elections
Cardiff City were the only Southern League club to apply for election to the Football League. They were successful and, along with Leeds United, replaced Grimsby Town and Lincoln City in the Football League Second Division.

After the voting, 21 clubs remained in Southern League alongside Grimsby, having gained more votes than other non-elected clubs, were then elected into the newly created Third Division.

References

External links
Southern League First Division Tables RSSSF
Southern League Second Division Tables  RSSSF
Football Club History Database

1919-20
1919–20 in English football leagues
1919–20 in Welsh football